Jop van der Linden (born 17 July 1990) is a retired Dutch professional footballer who played as a centre back for Vitesse, AGOVV Apeldoorn, Helmond Sport, Go Ahead Eagles, AZ, Willem II, and Sydney FC. He retired in June 2019.

References

External links
 
 
 Voetbal International profile 

1990 births
Living people
Sportspeople from Apeldoorn
Association football central defenders
Dutch footballers
Netherlands youth international footballers
SBV Vitesse players
AGOVV Apeldoorn players
Helmond Sport players
Go Ahead Eagles players
AZ Alkmaar players
Jong AZ players
Willem II (football club) players
Sydney FC players
Eredivisie players
Eerste Divisie players
A-League Men players
Dutch expatriate footballers
Dutch expatriate sportspeople in Australia
Expatriate soccer players in Australia
Footballers from Gelderland